Jan Kierno (born 20 June 1952) is a former Polish footballer who played as a forward.

Biography
Born in Lidzbark Warmiński, Kierno started playing football with local side Polonia Lidzbark Warmiński. In 1971 Kierno moved to Gdańsk to play with Lechia Gdańsk. During his first season he didn't manage to break into the first team, making his Lechia debut the following season on 29 April 1973 against Wisłok Dębica. During his first 3 years with Lechia Kierno made 8 appearances in the II liga. After Lechia it is known that Kierno played for Olimpia Elbląg during the 1976–77 season, with it being a possibility he played for the team the 2 seasons prior too. After his time with Olimpia it is known that Kierno joined Gwardia Warsaw, winning the II liga northern group in his first season, and thus winning promotion to Poland's top division. In the I liga Kierno made 26 top flight appearances and scored 4 goals. In 1980 Kierno returned to Lechia, making a further 43 appearances and 6 goals in the league, and a total of 56 appearances and 7 goals in all competitions during his two spells with the club. In 1982 Kierno moved to Adelaide, Australia, and played for the Polish diaspora club Polonia Adelaide. After his playing career Kierno stayed in Australia.

Honours
Gwardia Warsaw
II liga (Northern group): 1977–98

References

1952 births
Lechia Gdańsk players
Olimpia Elbląg players
Gwardia Warsaw players
Polish footballers
Association football forwards
Living people
People from Lidzbark Warmiński
Polish expatriate footballers
Expatriate soccer players in Australia
Polish expatriate sportspeople in Australia
Polish emigrants to Australia